

Torrington Square is a square in Bloomsbury, owned by the University of London, located in central London, England. Today it is a square in name only, most of the houses having been demolished by the university. The southern end of the square is dominated by the University of London's Senate House. Birkbeck College and the School of Oriental and African Studies (SOAS) are located here. To the southwest is Malet Street and to the southeast is Russell Square. The square is the site of a weekly farmers' market, held on Thursdays.

Notable people
John Desmond Bernal lived in a flat at the top of no. 22. In November 1950, Pablo Picasso, a fellow communist, en route to a Soviet-sponsored World Peace Congress in Sheffield created a mural in Bernal's flat. In 2007, this became part of the Wellcome Trust's collection for £250,000. It was displayed at the 2012 Tate Britain exhibition on Picasso and Modern British Art. The poet Christina Rossetti lived at 30 Torrington Square until her death here on 29 December 1894 from breast cancer.

See also
Other squares on the Bedford Estate in Bloomsbury included:

Bedford Square
Bloomsbury Square
Gordon Square
Russell Square
Tavistock Square
Woburn Square

Bibliography
 Rasmussen, Sten Eiler. London: The Unique City. London: Penguin (Pelican), 1960.

References

External links

Squares in the London Borough of Camden
University of London
Birkbeck, University of London
SOAS University of London
Bloomsbury